Dahleh or Dahlah or Dehleh, also rendered as Daleh , may refer to:
 Dahleh, Fars
 Dahleh, Lorestan